This is a list of all the bus routes in Athens, Greece.

Symbolism

2005-Today

Trunk Routes
The trunk routes were created in 1995 as part of an attempt to create a bus rapid transit system in Athens. They actually were renamings of existing routes in order to have a common special numbering based letters and a common number when using the same street to exit the city centre. For example, all routes using the number 8 (A8, B8, Γ8) are passing from Patission street with a common start at Polytechneio. There were also express routes, whose name started with the letter E, that were special express rush-hour alterations of the A-lettered route of a certain line (for example route E7 followed the exact same path as route A7, but it was not calling on some stops). The main goal of these lines was to remove a vast number of bus routes from the Athens city center, which was heavily affected by traffic congestion at the time. With the creation of trunk routes most of the bus routes were relocated in suburbs. For example, routes "538 Kanigos-Kifissia and "508 Kanigos-Agios Stefanos" used to have a common start at Kanigos Square and then followed Kifissias Avenue until Kifissia, where 538 was turning in Kifissia whilst 508 continued further north to Agios Stefanos. After the trunk route system these routes were renamed to "A7 Kanigos-Kifissia" and "508 Kifissia-Agios Stefanos". Many routes like 508 had their starts moved to suburbs where a trunk route finished. This scheme was created only for distant suburbs of Athens such as Agios Stefanos, Vouliagmeni, Paiania, Ano Liossia and Mandra. In suburbs near the city centre, such as Ilioupoli, Vyronas, Psychiko and Galatsi, there was not any factual change on the bus routes. The routes initially had a distinct colour for each line but after 1998-1999 they practically had no difference from a normal bus route. These routes were heavily overshadowed by the metro system after its opening in 2000. In 2007, after the metro extension to Egaleo opened, the metro system had practically taken over the role of a trunk route. After 2011, when ETHEL (Athens Bus Company) and ILPAP (Athens Trolleybus Company) merged to avoid bankruptcy (both companies were heavily affected from the financial crisis) and formed OSY, many of these routes were discontinued and they were completely replaced by the metro system. Today only 19 of the 45 initial trunk routes are still in service (not counting the express routes).

Express Routes
This list does not contain express trunk routes. These routes are listed in the trunk routes section.

0XX Routes
These routes serve the Athens city centre.

1ΧΧ Routes
These routes serve Agios Dimitrios, Alimos, Anavyssos, Elliniko, Glyfada, Nea Smyrni, Palaia Fokaia, Palaio Faliro, Saronida, Vari, Varkiza, Voula and Vouliagmeni. Areas that are not part of sector 1 but are served by these routes include Argyroupoli (140, 164, 165), Athens (100, 140), Glyka Nera (125), Ilioupoli (140, 155, 164, 165), Kaisariani (140), Koropi (120, 125), Neo Psychiko (140), Paiania (125), Psychiko (140), Vyronas (140), Ymittos (140), Zografou (140)

2XX Routes
These routes serve Dafni, Ilioupoli, Kesariani, Vyronas, Ymittos and Zografou. (Line 200 was an exception as it served the Athens city centre).

3XX Routes
These routes serve Anthoussa, Artemis, Gerakas, Glyka Nera, Koropi, Marathonas, Nea Makri, Pallini, Peania, Pikermi, Rafina and Spata. (Line 300 is an exception as it serves Piraeus).

4XX Routes
These routes serve Agia Paraskevi, Halandri, Holargos, Melissia, Nea Penteli, Papagou, Penteli and Vrilissia.

5XX Routes
These routes serve Agios Stefanos, Anixi, Dionysos, Drosia, Ekali, Kifissia, Kryoneri, Lykovrysi, Maroussi, Metamorfossi, Nea Erythrea, Pefki, Rodopoli and Stamata

6XX Routes
These routes serve Filothei, Galatsi, Iraklio, Nea Halkidona, Nea Filadelfia, Nea Ionia and Psychiko

7XX Routes
These routes serve Agioi Anargyroi, Acharnes, Ano Liossia, Fyli, Ilion, Kamatero, Peristeri, Petroupoli and Thrakomakedones

8XX Routes
These routes serve Agia Varvara, Aspropyrgos, Drapetsona, Egaleo, Elefsina, Erythres, Haidari, Keratsini, Korydallos, Magoula, Mandra, Nikea, Oinoi, Perama, Rentis, Tavros and Vilia.

9XX Routes
These routes serve Kallithea, Moschato and Piraeus

Trolleybus Routes
These routes were operated by ILPAP until 2011. Most of these lines run on the same path as lines of the old Athens Tramway. The routes for a brief period formed part of the three-digit OASA numerical system as 001 to 020 respectively. This was discontinued in 1999, when route 21 was created, to avoid confusion with the existing bus route 021.

1995-2005

Evolution of Athens bus routes by year
•: Any type of change occurred on the route.

Notes

References

Bus transport in Greece
Bus routes
Bus